Orophia haeresiella is a species of moth in the family Depressariidae. It was described by Wallengren in 1875, and is known from South Africa.

References

Endemic moths of South Africa
Moths described in 1875
Orophia
Moths of Africa